Christian Ilić (born 22 July 1996) is an Austrian professional footballer of Croatian descent who last plays as a midfielder for Cypriot club Doxa Katokopias.

Club career
Ilić made his Austrian Football First League debut for TSV Hartberg on 12 September 2014 in a game against SKN St. Pölten.

Ilić signed a one-year contract with Motherwell on 12 July 2019. On 31 May 2020, Motherwell confirmed that Ilić was leaving the club at the end of his contract.

On 21 August 2020, Ilić signed a two-year contract with Bulgarian club Lokomotiv Plovdiv.

References

External links

 Austrian career stats - ÖFB

1996 births
Living people
Footballers from Carinthia (state)
People from Friesach
Association football midfielders
Austrian people of Croatian descent
Austrian footballers
SC Weiz players
TSV Hartberg players
Motherwell F.C. players
PFC Lokomotiv Plovdiv players
FC Kryvbas Kryvyi Rih players
2. Liga (Austria) players
Austrian Regionalliga players
Austrian Football Bundesliga players
Scottish Professional Football League players
First Professional Football League (Bulgaria) players
Ukrainian First League players
Austrian expatriate footballers
Expatriate footballers in Scotland
Austrian expatriate sportspeople in Scotland
Expatriate footballers in Bulgaria
Austrian expatriate sportspeople in Bulgaria
Expatriate footballers in Ukraine
Austrian expatriate sportspeople in Ukraine
Expatriate footballers in Cyprus
Austrian expatriate sportspeople in Cyprus